"The Edge of Heaven" is a song by English pop duo Wham!, released on Epic Records in 1986. It was written and produced by George Michael, one half of the duo, and was promoted in advance as Wham!'s farewell single.

History
With the known desire of George Michael to move into a more adult market, Wham! had announced in the spring of 1986 that Michael and his musical partner Andrew Ridgeley would go their separate ways after a farewell single, album and concert. The album was called The Final and the concert was held in front of 72,000 fans at London's Wembley Stadium on Saturday 28 June 1986.
Prior to the official release date of the single, the song had been performed during their 1985 "Whamamerica!" tour.

The single, a five-minute tale of emotional and physical frustration within a relationship, was a slick and upbeat — albeit harder-edged than earlier works — pop tune which featured a guest appearance by Elton John, a friend of Michael and Ridgeley, on piano. It became the fourth No. 1 in the UK Singles Chart (and the final US Top Ten hit, reaching #10) for the duo. It was also to be their last UK number one for almost 35 years; they would not top the UK Singles Chart again until "Last Christmas" finally reached that milestone in January 2021. 

Michael has said the lyrics to the song were "deliberately and overtly sexual, especially the first verse". The reason for this, he says, was he thought no one would care "because no one listens to a Wham! lyric. It had got to that stage."

Epic released a double record set in the UK, with an updated version of Wham!'s early signature song "Wham Rap! (Enjoy What You Do)" on the flip of disc one, and two new songs - "Battlestations" and a cover of the Was (Not Was) song "Where Did Your Heart Go?"—on the flip of the second disc. "Where Did Your Heart Go?" was later given an equal billing and reached a lowly position in the UK Top 40 as a result.

In the United States, "The Edge of Heaven" was backed with a live version of "Blue" from Wham!'s tour of China. "Where Did Your Heart Go?" was released separately as the follow-up and the fourth and last single from Music from the Edge of Heaven (the shortened American version of The Final), and charted at #50 (backed with "Wham! Rap '86").

Reception
Cash Box said that "The live-wire, uptempo track moves along at a "Wake Me Up Before You GoGo" pace.."

Music video

The official music video for the song was directed by Andy Morahan and filmed at stage 1, Twickenham Film Studios on 5 June 1986. It features a performance in front of a crowd and is filmed in black and white. It features a brief early appearance by Danny John-Jules, emerging from the audience to dance alongside Michael onstage, as well as appearances by David Austin on guitar and Deon Estus on bass.

Track listing

Chart and certifications

Weekly charts

Year-end charts

Certifications

References

External links
[ AllMusic.com entry for "The Edge of Heaven"]

1985 songs
1986 singles
Columbia Records singles
Dutch Top 40 number-one singles
European Hot 100 Singles number-one singles
Music videos directed by Andy Morahan
Song recordings produced by George Michael
Songs written by George Michael
UK Singles Chart number-one singles
Wham! songs